A Step Further is the fourth album by the band Savoy Brown. It was released by Decca in the U.K. and by Parrot in the U.S. in September 1969. This is the last album recorded with long time pianist Bob Hall. The album track "Made Up My Mind" had first appeared as the B-side of the US single release on Parrot Records 45-40039 (released June 1969), fronted by "Train to Nowhere", from their album Blue Matter. The track "Waiting in the Bamboo Grove" would later be released as the B-side of the UK single release on Decca F 13019 (released May 1970), of "A Hard Way To Go" from their album Raw Sienna.

Side Two was recorded live at Cooks Ferry Inn, Edmonton, London on Monday 12 May 1969.

Track listing

Side one
"Made Up My Mind" (Chris Youlden) – 2:56
"Waiting in the Bamboo Grove" (Kim Simmonds) – 3:37
"Life's One Act Play" (Youlden) – 6:29
"I'm Tired" (Youlden) – 3:21
"Where Am I" (Youlden) – 1:51

Side two
"Savoy Brown Boogie" (Live) (Simmonds, Youlden) – 22:02,
including: 
"Feel So Good" (Chuck Willis)
"Whole Lotta Shakin' Goin On" (Sunny David, Dave Williams)
"Little Queenie" (Chuck Berry)
"Purple Haze" (Jimi Hendrix)
"Hernando's Hideaway" (Richard Adler, Jerry Ross)

Personnel

Savoy Brown
 Chris Youlden – vocals
 Kim Simmonds – guitar
 Lonesome Dave – guitar
 Roger Earl – drums
 Tony Stevens – bass
 Bob Hall – piano

Technical
 Mike Vernon – producer, liner notes
 Dave Grinsted – engineer
 Colin Freeman, John Punter, Michael Mailes – assistant engineers
 Terry Noonan – musical arrangements on "Waiting in the Bamboo Grove", "Life's One Act Play" and "Where Am I"
 Terence Ibbott – photography

Charts

Album

Singles

References

External links
Savoy Brown's Homepage

Savoy Brown albums
1969 albums
Albums produced by Mike Vernon (record producer)
Decca Records albums
1969 live albums
Parrot Records live albums